The 2017 Oakland Athletics season was the 50th for the Oakland Athletics franchise in Oakland (all at Oakland Coliseum), as well as the 117th in club history. The A's began the season on April 3 at home against Los Angeles Angels of Anaheim and finished the season at the Texas Rangers on October 1. They finished the season in last place in their division and did not make the playoffs for the third consecutive season, but did finish the season on a strong note with a winning record in September.

For the first time in several years, the Coliseum featured the entire baseball configuration. The tarp covering much of the baseball seating was removed, although it remained on Mt. Davis as that section is football-only.

Offseason

October 2016 

Source

November 2016 

Source

December 2016 

Source

January 2017 

Source

February 2017 

Source

March 2017 

Source

Spring training
The A's participated in the Cactus League during pre-season spring training, finishing with a 16–18 win–loss record and no ties.

Regular season

American League West

American League Wild Card

Record against opponents

Game log

|- style="background:#cfc
| 1 || April 3 || Angels || 4–2 || Graveman (1–0) || Nolasco (0–1) || Casilla (1) || 36,067 || 1–0 || W1
|- style="background:#fbb
| 2 || April 4 || Angels || 6–7 || Bailey (1–0) || Dull (0–1) || Bedrosian (1) || 11,225 || 1–1 || L1
|- style="background:#fbb
| 3 || April 5 || Angels || 0–5 || Ramírez (1–0) || Cotton (0–1) || — || 13,405 || 1–2 || L2
|- style="background:#cfc
| 4 || April 6 || Angels || 5–1 || Triggs (1–0) || Skaggs (0–1) || — || 13,292 || 2–2 || W1
|- style="background:#fbb
| 5 || April 7 || @ Rangers || 5–10 || Claudio (1–0) || Alcántara (0–1) || — || 34,235 || 2–3 || L1
|- style="background:#cfc
| 6 || April 8 || @ Rangers || 6–1 || Graveman (2–0) || Darvish (0–1) || — || 44,410 || 3–3 || W1
|- style="background:#fbb
| 7 || April 9 || @ Rangers || 1–8 || Pérez (1–1) || Manaea (0–1) || — || 36,905 || 3–4 || L1
|- style="background:#cfc
| 8 || April 10 || @ Royals || 2–0 || Cotton (1–1) || Kennedy (0–2) || Doolittle (1) || 40,019 || 4–4 || W1
|- style="background:#cfc
| 9 || April 12 || @ Royals || 8–3 || Triggs (2–0) || Hammel (0–1) || — || 24,380 || 5–4 || W2
|- style="background:#fbb
| 10 || April 13 || @ Royals || 1–3 || Vargas (2–0) || Hahn (0–1) || Herrera (1) || 22,160 || 5–5 || L1
|- style="background:#fbb
| 11 || April 14 || Astros || 2–7 || Keuchel (2–0) || Madson (0–1) || — || 15,385 || 5–6 || L2
|- style="background:#fbb
| 12 || April 15 || Astros || 6–10 || Harris (1–0) || Casilla (0–1) || — || 20,140 || 5–7 || L3
|- style="background:#bbb
| — || April 16 || Astros || colspan="9" | Postponed (rain). Rescheduled to September 9.
|- style="background:#fbb
| 13 || April 17 || Rangers || 0–7 || Griffin (2–0) || Cotton (1–2) || — || 10,406 || 5–8 || L4
|- style="background:#cfc
| 14 || April 18 || Rangers || 4–2 || Triggs (3–0) || Darvish (1–2) || Casilla (2) || 12,091 || 6–8 || W1
|- style="background:#cfc
| 15 || April 19 || Rangers || 9–1 || Hahn (1–1) || Pérez (1–2) || — || 14,031 || 7–8 || W2
|- style="background:#cfc
| 16 || April 20 || Mariners || 9–6 || Dull (1–1) || Scribner (0–2) || — || 10,707 || 8–8 || W3
|- style="background:#cfc
| 17 || April 21 || Mariners || 3–1 || Manaea (1–1) || Iwakuma (0–2) || Casilla (3) || 15,255 || 9–8 || W4
|- style="background:#cfc
| 18 || April 22 || Mariners || 4–3 || Cotton (2–2) || Miranda (1–2) || Madson (1) || 20,722 || 10–8 || W5
|- style=background:#fbb
| 19 || April 23 || Mariners || 1–11 || Gallardo (1–2) || Triggs (3–1) || — || 24,165 || 10–9 || L1
|- style="background:#fbb
| 20 || April 25 || @ Angels || 1–2 (11) || Pounders (1–0) || Madson (0–2) || — || 30,124 || 10–10 || L2
|- style="background:#fbb
| 21 || April 26 || @ Angels || 5–8 || Shoemaker (1–1) || Manaea (1–2) || Norris (3) || 30,248 || 10–11 || L3
|- style=background:#fbb
| 22 || April 27 || @ Angels || 1–2 || Nolasco (2–2) || Graveman (2–1) || Norris (4) || 37,603 || 10–12 || L4
|- style=background:#fbb
| 23 || April 28 || @ Astros || 4–9 || Morton (2–2) || Cotton (2–3) || — || 28,472 || 10–13 || L5
|- style=background:#cfc
| 24 || April 29 || @ Astros || 2–1 || Triggs (4–1) || Musgrove (1–2) || Casilla (4) || 32,147 || 11–13 || W1
|- style=background:#fbb
| 25 || April 30 || @ Astros || 2–7 || Keuchel (5–0) || Hahn (1–2) || Giles (6) || 34,880 || 11–14 || L1
|-

|- style=background:#fbb
| 26 || May 2 || @ Twins || 1–9 || Santana (5–0) || Gray (0–1) || — || 18,930 || 11–15 || L1
|- style=background:#fbb
| 27 || May 3 || @ Twins || 4–7 || Santiago (3–1) || Graveman (2–2) || – || 18,658 || 11–16 || L2
|- style=background:#cfc
| 28 || May 4 || @ Twins || 8–5 || Cotton (3–3) || Gibson (0–4)  || Casilla (5) || 19,247 || 12–16 || W1
|- style=background:#fbb
| 29 || May 5 || Tigers || 2–7 || Fulmer (3–1) || Triggs (4–2) || — || 17,519 || 12–17 || L1
|- style=background:#cfc
| 30 || May 6 || Tigers || 6–5 || Montas (1–0) || Rodríguez (1–3) || — || 16,651 || 13–17 || W1
|- style=background:#cfc
| 31 || May 7 || Tigers || 8–6 || Casilla (1–1) || Rodríguez (1–4) ||— || 23,227 || 14–17 || W2
|- style=background:#cfc
| 32 || May 8 || Angels || 3–2 ||Hendriks (1–0) || Guerra (2–2) || — || 10,292 || 15–17 || W3
|- style=background:#fbb
| 33 || May 9 || Angels || 3–7 || Meyer (1–1) || Cotton (3–4) ||  Norris (6) || 11,383 || 15–18 || L1
|- style=background:#cfc
| 34 || May 10 || Angels || 3–1 ||Triggs (5–2) || Chavez (2–5) || Casilla (6) || 11,061 || 16–18 || W1
|- style=background:#fbb
| 35 || May 12 || @ Rangers || 2–5 || Kela (1–1) || Casilla (1–2) || — || 35,625 || 16–19 || L1
|- style=background:#fbb
| 36 || May 13 || @ Rangers || 5–6 || Barnette (1–0) || Dull (1–2) || Bush (3) || 37,898 || 16–20 || L2
|- style=background:#fbb
| 37 || May 14 || @ Rangers || 4–6 || Álvarez (2–0) || Madson (0–3) || Bush (4) || 35,157 || 16–21 || L3
|- style=background:#fbb
| 38 || May 15 || @ Mariners || 5–6 || Gallardo (2–3) || Manaea (1–3) || Zych (1) || 15,431 || 16–22 || L4
|- style=background:#cfc
| 39 || May 16 || @ Mariners || 9–6 || Madson (1–3) || Cishek (0–1) || — || 13,955 || 17–22 || W1
|- style=background:#fbb
| 40 || May 17 || @ Mariners || 0–4 || Bergman (1–1) || Hahn (1–3) || — || 14,117 || 17–23 || L1
|- style=background:#cfc
| 41 || May 18 || Red Sox || 8–3 || Gray (1–1) || Velázquez (0–1) || — || 12,016 || 18–23 || W1
|- style=background:#cfc
| 42 || May 19 || Red Sox || 3–2 (10) || Dull (2–2) || Hembree (0–2) || — || 24,728 || 19–23 || W2
|- style=background:#cfc
| 43 || May 20 || Red Sox || 8–3 || Manaea (2–3) || Taylor (0–1) || — || 20,235 || 20–23 || W3
|- style=background:#fbb
| 44 || May 21 || Red Sox || 3–12 || Rodríguez (3–1) || Triggs (5–3) || — || 20,691 || 20–24 || L1
|- style=background:#fbb
| 45 || May 23 || Marlins || 9–11 || Ureña (2–2) || Hahn (1–4) || — || 12,835 || 20–25 || L2
|- style=background:#cfc
| 46 || May 24 || Marlins || 4–1 || Gray (2–1) || Vólquez (0–7) || Casilla (7) || 19,738 || 21–25 || W1
|- style=background:#cfc
| 47 || May 26 || @ Yankees || 4–1 || Manaea (3–3) || Tanaka (5–4) || — || 39,044 || 22–25 || W2
|- style=background:#fbb
| 48 || May 27 || @ Yankees || 2–3 || Sabathia (5–2) || Cotton (3–5) || Betances (5) || 40,218 || 22–26 || L1
|- style=background:#fbb
| 49 || May 28 || @ Yankees || 5–9 || Pineda (6–2) || Triggs (5–4) || Warren (1) || 45,232 || 22–27 || L2
|- style=background:#fbb
| 50 || May 29 || @ Indians || 3–5 || Carrasco (5–2) || Mengden (0–1) || Allen (14) || 20,792 || 22–28 || L3
|- style=background:#fbb
| 51 || May 30 || @ Indians || 4–9 || Bauer (5–4) || Gray (2–2) || — || 14,184 || 22–29 || L4
|- style=background:#cfc
| 52 || May 31 || @ Indians || 3–1 || Manaea (4–3) || Clevinger (2–2) || Casilla (7) || 16,784 || 23–29 || W1
|-

|- style=background:#fbb
| 53 || June 1 || @ Indians || 0–8 || Kluber (4–2) || Cotton (3–6) || — || 19,767 || 23–30 || L1
|- style=background:#fbb
| 54 || June 2 || Nationals || 3–13 || Strasburg (7–1) || Triggs (5–5) || — || 20,813 || 23–31 || L2
|- style=background:#cfc
| 55 || June 3 || Nationals || 10–4 || Hendriks (2–0) || Ross (2–2) || — || 23,921 || 24–31 || W1
|- style=background:#fbb
| 56 || June 4 || Nationals || 10–11 || Roark (6–2) || Madson (1–4) || Kelley (4) || 21,265 || 24–32 || L1
|- style=background:#cfc
| 57 || June 5 || Blue Jays || 5–3 || Manaea (5–3) || Happ (0–4) || Casilla (9) || 12,890 || 25–32 || W1
|- style=background:#cfc
| 58 || June 6 || Blue Jays || 4–1 || Hahn (2–4) || Estrada (4–4) || Casilla (10) || 16,643 || 26–32 || W2
|- style=background:#fbb
| 59 || June 7 || Blue Jays || 5–7 (10) || Tepera (4–1) || Montas (1–1) || Osuna (14) || 15,076 || 26–33 || L1
|- style=background:#fbb
| 60 || June 9 || @ Rays || 4–13 || Cobb (5–5) || Triggs (5–6) || — || 13,153 || 26–34 || L2
|- style=background:#fbb
| 61 || June 10 (1) || @ Rays || 5–6 (10) || Pruitt (5–1) || Hendriks (2–1) || — || 17,775 || 26–35 || L3
|- style=background:#cfc
| 62 || June 10 (2) || @ Rays || 7–2 || Manaea (6–3) || Hu (0–1) || — || 17,775 || 27–35 || W1
|- style=background:#fbb
| 63 || June 11 || @ Rays || 4–5 || Whitley (2–1) || Coulombe (0–1) || Colomé (18) || 13,640 || 27–36 || L1
|- style=background:#fbb
| 64 || June 13 || @ Marlins || 1–8 || Ureña (5–2) || Cotton (3–7) || — || 19,953 || 27–37 || L2
|- style=background:#fbb
| 65 || June 14 || @ Marlins || 6–11 || Barraclough (2–1) || Gossett (0–1) || || 19,436 || 27–38 || L3
|- style=background:#cfc
| 66 || June 15 || Yankees || 8–7 (10) || Hendriks (3–1) || Gallegos (0–1) || — || 21,838 || 28–38 || W1
|- style=background:#cfc
| 67 || June 16 || Yankees || 7–6 || Coulombe (1–1) || Holder (1–1) || Casilla (11) || 30,184 || 29–38 || W2
|- style=background:#cfc
| 68 || June 17 || Yankees || 5–2 || Hahn (3–4) || Tanaka (5–7) || Doolittle (2) || 31,418 || 30–38 || W3
|- style=background:#cfc
| 69 || June 18 || Yankees || 4–3 || Cotton (4–7) || Cessa (0–1) || Doolittle (3) || 34,140 || 31–38 || W4
|- style=background:#fbb
| 70 || June 19 || Astros || 1–4 || Peacock (4–1) || Gossett (0–2) || Giles (17) || 10,482 || 31–39 || L1
|- style=background:#fbb
| 71 || June 20 || Astros || 4–8 || Martes (2–0) || Gray (2–3) || — || 15,362 || 31–40 || L2
|- style=background:#fbb
| 72 || June 21 || Astros || 1–5 || Fiers (5–2) || Manaea (6–4) || — || 12,277 || 31–41 || L3
|- style=background:#fbb
| 73 || June 22 || Astros || 9–12 || Paulino (2–0) || Hahn (3–5) || Devenski (3) || 18,747 || 31–42 || L4
|- style=background:#bfb
| 74 || June 23 || @ White Sox || 3–0 || Cotton (5–7) || Pelfrey (3–6) || Casilla (12) || 25,370 || 32–42 || W1
|- style=background:#bfb
| 75 || June 24 || @ White Sox || 10–2 || Gossett (1–2) || Shields (1–1) || —|| 38,618 || 33–42 || W2
|- style=background:#bfb
| 76 || June 25 || @ White Sox || 5–3 || Gray (3–3) || Kahnle (0–2) || Casilla (13) || 28,089 || 34–42 || W3
|- style=background:#bfb
| 77 || June 27 || @ Astros || 6–4 || Manaea (7–4) || Fiers (5–3) || Casilla (14) || 28,312 || 35–42 || W4
|- style=background:#fbb
| 78 || June 28 || @ Astros || 8–11 || Feliz (4–1) || Hahn (3–6) || Giles (18) || 34,075 || 35–43 || L1
|- style=background:#fbb
| 79 || June 29 || @ Astros || 1–6 || Peacock (5–1) || Gossett (1–3) || — || 29,509 || 35–44 || L2
|- style=background:#fbb
| 80 || June 30 || Braves || 1–3 || Foltynewicz (6–5) || Gray (3–4) || Johnson (17) || 19,286 || 35–45 || L3
|-

|- style=background:#fbb
| 81 || July 1 || Braves || 3–4 || Freeman (1–0) || Casilla (1–3) || Johnson (18) || 22,230 || 35–46 || L4
|- style=background:#fbb
| 82 || July 2 || Braves || 3–4 (11) || Johnson (6–1) || Axford (0–1) || Vizcaíno (2) || 18,438 || 35–47 || L5
|- style=background:#fbb
| 83 || July 3 || White Sox || 2–7 || Rodon (1–1) || Cotton (5–8) || – || 40,019 || 35–48 || L6
|- style=background:#cfc
| 84 || July 4 || White Sox || 7–6 || Casilla (2–3) || Kahnle (0–3) || — || 16,314 || 36–48 || W1
|- style=background:#cfc
| 85 || July 5 || White Sox  || 7–4 || Gray (4–4) || Pelfrey (3–7) || — || 13,813 || 37–48 || W2
|- style=background:#cfc
| 86 || July 6 || @ Mariners || 7–4 || Blackburn (1–0) || Gaviglio (3–4) || — || 18,368 || 38–48 || W3
|- style=background:#fbb
| 87 || July 7 || @ Mariners || 2–7 || Paxton (7–3) || Manaea (7–5) || — || 22,213 || 38–49 || L1
|- style=background:#cfc
| 88 || July 8 || @ Mariners || 4–3 || Doolittle (1–0) || Díaz (2–4)|| Casilla (15) || 28,694 || 39–49 || W1
|- style=background:#fbb
| 89 || July 9 || @ Mariners || 0–4 || Hernández (4–3) || Gossett (1–4) || — || 32,661 || 39–50 || L1
|- style="text-align:center; background:#bbcaff;"
| colspan="10" | 88th All-Star Game in Miami, Florida
|- style=background:#cfc
| 90 || July 14 || Indians || 5–0 || Gray (5–4) || Carrasco (10–4) || — || 19,870 || 40–50 || W1
|- style=background:#cfc
| 91 || July 15 || Indians || 5–3 || Madson (2–4) || Miller (3–3) || — || 33,021 || 41–50 || W2
|- style=background:#cfc
| 92 || July 16 || Indians || 7–3 || Manaea (8–5) || Bauer (7–8) || — || 25,509 || 42–50 || W3
|- style=background:#fbb
| 93 || July 17 || Rays || 2–3 || Odorizzi (6–4) || Gossett (1–5) || Colomé (27) || 9,736 || 42–51 || L1
|- style=background:#fbb
| 94 || July 18 || Rays || 3–4 || Kolarek (1–0) || Casilla (2–4) || Colomé (20) || 15,231 || 42–52 || L2
|- style=background:#cfc
| 95 || July 19 || Rays || 7–2 || Gray (6–4) || Faria (4–1) || — || 17,019 || 43–52 || W1
|- style=background:#fbb
| 96 || July 21 || @ Mets || 5–7 || Robles (5–1) || Blackburn (1–1) || Blevins (1) || 26,969 || 43–53 || L1
|- style=background:#fbb
| 97 || July 22 || @ Mets || 5–6 || Robles (6–1) || Castro (0–1) || — || 39,629 || 43–54 || L2
|- style=background:#cfc
| 98 || July 23 || @ Mets || 3–2 || Gossett (2–5) || Montero (1–7) || Casilla (16) || 29,037 || 44–54 || W1
|- style=background:#fbb
| 99 || July 24 || @ Blue Jays || 2–4 || Liriano (6–5) || C. Smith (0–1) || Osuna (25) || 39,613 || 44–55 || L1
|- style=background:#fbb
| 100 || July 25 || @ Blue Jays || 1–4 || Valdez (1–0) || Gray (6–5) || Osuna (26) || 40,624 || 44–56 || L2
|- style=background:#fbb
| 101 || July 26 || @ Blue Jays || 2–3 || Biagini (3–8) || Casilla (2–5) || — || 41,984 || 44–57 || L3
|- style=background:#fbb
| 102 || July 27 || @ Blue Jays || 4–8 (10) || Osuna (3–0) || Hendriks (3–2) || — || 47,484 || 44–58 || L4
|- style=background:#fbb
| 103 || July 28 || Twins || 3–6 || García (5–7) || Gossett (2–6) || Kintzler (28) || 17,727 || 44–59 || L5
|- style=background:#cfc
| 104 || July 29 || Twins || 5–4 || Coulombe (2–1) || Rogers (5–3) || — || 27,047 || 45–59 || W1
|- style=background:#cfc
| 105 || July 30 || Twins || 6–5 || J. Smith (1–0) || Duffey (0–3) || — || 16,790 || 46–59 || W2
|- style=background:#cfc
| 106 || July 31 || Giants || 8–5 || Blackburn (2–1) || Osich (3–2) || Treinen (1) || 38,391 || 47–59 || W3
|-

|- style=background:#fbb
| 107 || August 1 || Giants || 4–10 || Samardzija (6–11) || Manaea (8–6) || — || 38,871 || 47–60 || L1
|- style=background:#cfc
| 108 || August 2 || @ Giants || 6–1 || Gossett (3–6) || Moore (3–11) || — || 40,635 || 48–60 || W1
|- style=background:#fbb
| 109 || August 3 || @ Giants || 2–11 || Blach (7–7) || Graveman (2–3) || — || 39,883 || 48–61 || L1
|- style=background:#fbb
| 110 || August 4 || @ Angels || 6–8 || Chavez (6–10) || Coulombe (2–2) || Norris (18) || 43,330 || 48–62 || L2
|- style=background:#cfc
| 111 || August 5 || @ Angels || 5–0 || Blackburn (3–1) || Skaggs (1–2) || — || 39,180 || 49–62 || W1
|- style=background:#cfc
| 112 || August 6 || @ Angels || 11–10 || J. Smith (2–0) || Norris (1–5) || Treinen (5) || 38,278 || 50–62 || W2
|- style=background:#fbb
| 113 || August 8 || Mariners || 6–7 (10) || Rzepczynski (2–0) || J. Smith (2–1) || Díaz (24) || 12,354 || 50–63 || L1
|- style=background:#fbb
| 114 || August 9 || Mariners || 3–6 || Pagan (1–2) || Cotton (5–9) || Diaz (25) || 14,989 || 50–64 || L2
|- style=background:#fbb
| 115 || August 10 || Orioles || 2–7 || Miley (6–9) || C. Smith (0–2) || Britton (10) || 11,386 || 50–65 || L3
|- style=background:#cfc
| 116 || August 11 || Orioles || 5–4 || Casilla (3–5) || Brach (3–3) || Treinen (6) || 14,330 || 51–65 || W1
|- style=background:#fbb
| 117 || August 12 || Orioles || 5–12 || Bundy (12–8) || Manaea (8–7) || — || 29,742 || 51–66 || L1
|- style=background:#cfc
| 118 || August 13 || Orioles || 9–3 || Graveman (3–3) || Hellickson (7–7) || — || 18,912 || 52–66 || W1
|- style=background:#fbb
| 119 || August 14 || Royals || 2–6 || Junis (5–2) || Cotton (5–10) || — || 9,848 || 52–67 || L1
|- style=background:#cfc
| 120 || August 15 || Royals || 10–8 || Treinen (1–2) || Minor (5–5) || — || 13,875 || 53–67 || W1
|- style=background:#fbb
| 121 || August 16 || Royals || 6–7 || Maurer (2–5) || Treinen (1–3) || Herrera (26) || 15,239 || 53–68 || L1
|- style=background:#fbb
| 122 || August 18 || @ Astros || 1–3 || Keuchel (11–2) || Manaea (8–8) || Giles (24) || 30,908 || 53–69 || L2
|- style=background:#fbb
| 123 || August 19 || @ Astros || 0–3 || McHugh (1–2) || Graveman (3–4) || Clippard (4) || 32,796 || 53–70 || L3
|- style=background:#cfc
| 124 || August 20 || @ Astros || 3–2 || Cotton (6–10) || Peacock (10–2) || Treinen (7) || 34,011 || 54–70 || W1
|- style=background:#fbb
| 125 || August 21 || @ Orioles || 3–7 || Miley (7–10) || C. Smith (0–3) || Britton (11) || 16,020 || 54–71 || L1
|- style=background:#cfc
| 126 || August 22 || @ Orioles || 6–4 || Castro (1–1) || Jiménez (5–9) || Treinen (8) || 18,493 || 55–71 || W1
|- style=background:#fbb
| 127 || August 23 || @ Orioles || 7–8 (12) || Castro (3–1) || Castro (1–2) || — || 20,072 || 55–72 || L1
|- style=background:#cfc
| 128 || August 25 || Rangers || 3–1 || Graveman (4–4) || Martinez (3–5) || Treinen (9) || 14,499 || 56–72 || W1
|- style=background:#cfc
| 129 || August 26 || Rangers || 8–3 || Manaea (9–8) || Hamels (9–2) || — || 22,471 || 57–72 || W2
|- style=background:#cfc
| 130 || August 27 || Rangers || 8–3 || Cotton (7–10) || Griffin (3–7) || Treinen (10) || 16,335 || 58–72 || W3
|- style=background:#fbb
| 131 || August 28 || @ Angels || 1–3 || Heaney (1–0) || Gossett (3–7) || Parker (3) || 33,719 || 58–73 || L1
|- style=background:#fbb
| 132 || August 29 || @ Angels || 2–8 || Chavez (7–10) || C. Smith (0–4) || — || 36,229 || 58–74 || L2
|- style=background:#fbb
| 133 || August 30 || @ Angels || 8–10 || Bedrosian (4–3) || Hatcher (0–2) || Parker (4) || 36,022 || 58–75 || L3
|-

|- style=background:#fbb
| 134 || September 1 || @ Mariners || 2–3 || Leake (8–12) || Manaea (9–9) || Díaz (31) || 19,030 || 58–76 || L4
|- style=background:#fbb
| 135 || September 2 || @ Mariners || 6–7 || Díaz (3–5) || Treinen (1–4) || — || 22,245 || 58–77 || L5
|- style=background:#fbb
| 136 || September 3 || @ Mariners || 2–10 || Albers (3–1) || Gossett (3–8) || — || 26,898 || 58–78 || L6
|- style=background:#fbb
| 137 || September 4 || Angels || 9–11 (11) || Salas (2–2) || Treinen (1–5) || Middleton (3) || 14,571 || 58–79 || L7
|- style=background:#fbb
| 138 || September 5 || Angels || 7–8 (10) || Bedrosian (5–4) || Treinen (1–6) || Paredes (1) || 11,110 || 58–80 || L8
|- style=background:#cfc
| 139 || September 6 || Angels || 3–1 || Manaea (10–9) || Skaggs (1–5) || Hatcher (1) || 10,544 || 59–80 || W1
|- style=background:#cfc
| 140 || September 8 || Astros || 9–8 || Treinen (2–6) || Giles (1–3) || — || 12,288 || 60–80 || W2
|- style=background:#cfc
| 141 || September 9 (1) || Astros || 11–1 || Gossett (4–8) || Morton (11–7) || — ||  || 61–80 || W3
|- style=background:#cfc
| 142 || September 9 (2) || Astros || 11–4 || Hatcher (1–2) || Devenski (8–4) || — || 19,244 || 62–80 || W4
|- style=background:#cfc
| 143 || September 10 || Astros || 10–2 || Graveman (5–4) || Keuchel (12–4) || — || 15,892 || 63–80 || W5
|- style=background:#fbb
| 144 || September 12 || @ Red Sox || 1–11 || Rodríguez (5–5) || Manaea (10–10) || — || 34,355 || 63–81 || L1
|- style=background:#cfc
| 145 || September 13 || @ Red Sox || 7–3 || Cotton (8–10) || Fister (5–8) || — || 36,366 || 64–81 || W1
|- style=background:#fbb
| 146 || September 14 || @ Red Sox || 2–6 || Pomeranz (16–5) || Gossett (4–9) || — || 35,470 || 64–82 || L1
|- style=background:#cfc
| 147 || September 15 || @ Phillies || 4–0 || Mengden (1–1) || Leiter (3–6) || — || 24,061 || 65–82 || W1
|- style=background:#fbb
| 148 || September 16 || @ Phillies || 3–5 || Arano (1–0) || Castro (1–3) || Neris (21) || 24,290 || 65–83 || L1
|- style=background:#cfc
| 149 || September 17 || @ Phillies || 6–3 || Manaea (11–10) || Álvarez (0–1) || Treinen (11) || 28,054 || 66–83 || W1
|- style=background:#cfc
| 150 || September 18 || @ Tigers || 8–3 || Hendriks (4–2) || Farmer (4–4) || — || 23,895 || 67–83 || W2
|- style=background:#cfc
| 151 || September 19 || @ Tigers || 9–8 || Casilla (4–5) || Wilson (2–5) || Treinen (12) || 23,460 || 68–83 || W3
|- style=background:#cfc
| 152 || September 20 || @ Tigers || 3–2 || Mengden (2–1) || Sánchez (3–5) || Hendriks (1) || 26,913 || 69–83 || W4
|- style=background:#cfc
| 153 || September 22 || Rangers || 4–1 || Graveman (6–4) || Martinez (3–7) || Treinen (13) || 13,848 || 70–83 || W5
|- style=background:#cfc
| 154 || September 23 || Rangers || 1–0 || Alcántara (1–1) || González (8–12) || Treinen (14) || 38,034 || 71–83 ||W6
|- style=background:#cfc
| 155 || September 24 || Rangers || 8–1 || Cotton (9–10) || Pérez (12–12) || — || 18,601 || 72–83 ||W7
|- style=background:#fbb
| 156 || September 25 || Mariners || 1–7 || Hernández (6–5) || Gossett (4–10) || Albers (1) || 9,329 || 72–84 ||L1
|- style=background:#fbb
| 157 || September 26 || Mariners || 3–6 || Pagan (2–3) || Mengden (2–2) || Díaz (33) || 13,513 || 72–85 ||L2
|- style=background:#cfc
| 158 || September 27 || Mariners || 6–5 || Treinen (3–6) || Simmons (0–1) || — || 13,132 || 73–85 ||W1
|- style=background:#cfc
| 159 || September 28 || @ Rangers || 4–1 || Manaea (12–10) || González (8–13) || Treinen (15) || 41,664 || 74–85 || W2
|- style=background:#fbb
| 160 || September 29 || @ Rangers || 3–5 || Perez (13–12) || Alcántara (1–2) || Claudio (11) || 28,459 || 74–86 || L1
|- style=background:#fbb
| 161 || September 30 || @ Rangers || 4–8 || Cashner (11–11) || Gossett (4–11) || — || 32,759 || 74–87 || L2
|- style=background:#cfc
| 162 || October 1 || @ Rangers || 5–2 || Mengden (3–2) || Hamels (11–6) || Treinen (16) || 33,961 || 75–87 || W1
|-

Roster

Farm system

Notes

References

External links
2017 Oakland Athletics season at Baseball Reference

Oakland Athletics seasons
Oakland Athletics
2010s in Oakland, California
Oakland Athletics